Brandon Edward Pursall (born 16 March 2004) is an English academy-level footballer who plays as a defender for Plymouth Parkway on loan from  side Plymouth Argyle.

Career
Pursall joined Argyle's academy set-up as an under-9. He represented the East Cornwall Schoolboys side in the under-14 and under-15 categories. He signed a two-year scholarship deal with Argyle in the summer of 2020.

Pursall made his professional debut on 8 September 2020, as a 76th minute substitute for club captain Gary Sawyer, in a 3–2 defeat to Norwich City U21s in the EFL Trophy.
He made his full debut in Argyle's next game in the competition, playing 90 minutes at left-centre-half, in Argyle's 2–0 EFL Trophy defeat to Cheltenham Town on 6 October 2020.

On 25 July 2022, Pursall signed for Southern Football League Premier Division South club Plymouth Parkway on a short-term loan deal.

Career statistics

References

Living people
2004 births
English footballers
Plymouth Argyle F.C. players
Plymouth Parkway F.C. players
Association football defenders